Mary Xavier Mehegan, S.C. was a Catholic religious sister and educator who founded the Sisters of Charity of Saint Elizabeth and opened New Jersey's first four-year college for women.

Early life
She was born Catherine Mehegan in Ireland in 1825, one of the ten children of Patrick Mehegan and Joanna Miles. Along with a sister, Margaret, she emigrated to the United States in 1842, settling in New York City. In 1846 she joined the Sisters of Charity there, who had been founded by Mother (now Saint) Elizabeth Bayley Seton in Maryland. A native of New York, in 1817 Seton sent sisters from the motherhouse in Emmitsburg, Maryland, to her native city. Taking the name by which she is now known, Mehegan joined the congregation and took her annual religious vows for the first time on 25 March 1847.

In 1853 James Roosevelt Bayley became the first Roman Catholic Bishop of Newark, with the Pro-Cathedral of St. Patrick serving as its seat. The nephew of Mother Seton, he immediately invited the community established by his aunt in nearby New York City to take charge of an orphanage run by St. Patrick's parish. Sister Mary Xavier Mehegan and Sister Mary Catherine Nevin were sent by their superiors to take up this work.

New Jersey
The two Sisters took up residence at the Orphan Asylum of St. Patrick in early 1854. Later that year, they encountered a resurgence of anti-Catholic prejudice when, on 5 September 1854, a march through the city was held by 3,000 members of the Orange Order. After reports of the other Catholic church of the city being broken into and looted, the Sisters took the orphans and locked themselves in the cathedral, where they spent the night. Later the Sisters also began to teach in the parish school, a service which they carried out until its closing in 1975.

In 1858 Bishop Bayley requested of their superiors in Emmitsburg that the Sisters in New Jersey be established as an independent congregation, with Mehegan as Mother Superior. She and Sister Mary Catherine, along with five recruits for the new religious institute, took their vows on that 19 July, at that time the feast day of St. Vincent de Paul, whose Rule of Life they followed. This feast was to become the traditional day for the annual renewal of their vows held by the Sisters. Approval of the new institute was received on 29 September 1859 and Mehegan was formally appointed the first Mother Superior of the new congregation, to be known as the Sisters of Charity of St. Elizabeth (in honor of the bishop's aunt and their foundress). Mehegan was to serve in this office until her death. At the time, they kept the religious habit and Constitutions of the Sisters in New York. Later in 1880, at the request of the bishop, they replaced the black widow's cap of Mother Seton with a black veil. In less than a year the first Catholic hospital in New Jersey was opened at St. Mary's, Newark.

On 2 July 1860, the mother-house was removed to the old Chegaray mansion at Madison, which had recently been vacated by Seton Hall College. The Academy of St. Elizabeth was opened the same year. During the Civil War Sisters of Charity cared for soldiers on both sides in emergency hospitals set up at the train stations in Newark and Trenton.

To accommodate the rapidly growing community the mother-house and academy were removed in 1880 to Convent Station, near Morristown. The site came to be known as Convent Station, from the name given to the train station they persuaded the New Jersey Railroad to open.

Mother Xavier served as Mother General for 56 years. Under her leadership, the Sisters opened parish schools, academies, hospitals, a day nursery, orphanages, a home for the incurably ill, and a residence for working women were established.

In 1899 Mehegan founded the College of Saint Elizabeth (renamed in 2020 to Saint Elizabeth University), which was the first four-year women's college in New Jersey. This was among the first women's colleges in the nation. Communities of Sisters were established beyond New Jersey to Connecticut, Massachusetts and New York State by the time of her death on 24 June 1915.

See also
Academy of St. Elizabeth

References

External links
New Jersey Women's History "Mary Xavier Mehegan"

1825 births
1915 deaths
Irish emigrants to the United States (before 1923)
Founders of Catholic religious communities
Daughters and Sisters of Charity of St. Vincent de Paul
20th-century American Roman Catholic nuns
19th-century American Roman Catholic nuns